Bunnicula is an American animated television series from Warner Bros. Animation developed by Jessica Borutski, produced by Borutski and Maxwell Atoms, and distributed by Warner Bros. Television. It premiered on Cartoon Network on February 6, 2016, and then premiered on Boomerang on the same day. The show is loosely based on the children's book series of the same name by James and Deborah Howe. It is a dark comedy about a vampire rabbit named Bunnicula who drinks carrot juice instead of blood to strengthen his super abilities in new paranormal adventures. New episodes aired same-day on Cartoon Network and Boomerang. In 2017, the series was picked up for a second and third season.

The series can be streamed on Boomerang's SVOD subscription service. The first season is also viewable by purchase on YouTube, within the United States, on both an individual-episode and full season basis.

In May 2018, Warner Bros. announced that the third season of Bunnicula would premiere on the Boomerang streaming service in 2019. However, every episode from that season first premiered on the Boomerang network, airing from December 1, and ended on December 30.

Since the series' ending, Boomerang continued to air reruns as of 2021.

Plot
After moving to New Orleans with her father and pets, Chester & Harold, Mina Monroe is left with a key given to her by her late Aunt Marie that she uses to open a cellar in the Orlock Apartments. Doing this frees a vampire rabbit named Bunnicula who drains vegetables instead of blood to strengthen his powers. Unaware of his traits, she adopts him and makes him a new member of the Monroe family. The series is mostly set with Chester and Harold joining Bunnicula in his supernatural adventures involving situations only he can solve.

Episodes

Characters

Main
 Bunnicula (voiced by Chris Kattan) - The titular character of the show, Bunnicula is a cute vampire Dutch rabbit and was once the pet of Dracula. Hence his name is a combination of the words "Bunny" and "Dracula". He is very different from the original version of the character who appears in the books. As it was said by Chester, Bunnicula was found in a locked chamber in the cellar of the apartment complex that Mina, Harold and Chester now live in. Also he is seen to have a few vampiric traits such as hiding from sunlight, sleeping in a coffin, flying with bat wings, and gaining sustenance by draining juice from vegetables and sometimes other plants(instead of blood) with his fangs. Bunnicula usually speaks a vampiric tongue, though he is capable of limited English, although Harold and other supernatural creatures understand his native language. Harold usually translates for Chester. He cares for Mina a great deal, but tends to cause mischief that yields supernatural consequences. Bunnicula sucks juices from vegetables and sometimes other plants(just like in the books) but different kinds of vegetables cause some kind of reaction in Bunnicula (large carrots enhance his vision, sugar beets make him hyperactive and speedy, squashes enlarge his feet, onions make him cry powerful jet streams of tears, garlic turns him into a skeleton bunny, ghost peppers make him breathe out a fire demon, rutabagas and a type of mango from Madagascar give him telekinesis, turnips turn the house upside-down, wasabi makes him spontaneously combust, leeks give him spider legs, eggplants turn him into a huge and hideous three-eyed monster rabbit, baby carrots make him shrink, rotten yams make him invisible, mandrake roots makes him taller with a more humanoid body, horseradish turns him into a horse, chili peppers make him breathe fire, ordinary broccolis and spinach makes him super strong, catnip turns him into a cat, celery makes him boring, cardoons turn him into a car, romanesco broccolis make exact clones of him, sunflowers give him allergies , iceberg lettuces turns him into a snowman and the ability to breathe ice and snow, thyme gives him the ability to travel in time etc. )
 Chester (voiced by Sean Astin) - Mina's sarcastic pet Siamese cat. Although he does value Bunnicula as a friend, he is often exasperated with him. This is mainly because he is constantly terrified of the monsters and supernatural phenomena that happen around him and his friends. He does appear to be a good thinker in certain situations, which has been acknowledged by Harold, although Harold has also correctly pointed out that "Chester's pretty smart, but he never actually learns from his mistakes". Chester is also a fan of reading, sudoku, and jazz music. In the books, Chester is an eccentric Orange tabby whose wild suspicions of occult phenomena constantly exasperate Harold.
 Harold (voiced by Brian Kimmet) - Mina's pet dog. He loves his friends Chester and Bunnicula, and their owner, Mina. He isn't overly intelligent, but despite this he is the only one who can fluently understand Bunnicula and usually translates for him to Chester. He is also fiercely loyal and values the friendships he has. Harold appears to be a brown Mutt. In the books, Harold is a ponderous, intelligent, thoughtful character, forced to put up with the eccentricities of Chester, Bunnicula, and Howie. Also in the books Harold resembles a Caucasian Shepherd, though he claims to have Russian Wolfhound in him as well.
 Mina Monroe (voiced by Kari Wahlgren) - A 13-year-old girl who just moved to New Orleans, Louisiana from Middle America with her father. It was seen in the opening that she was the one who freed Bunnicula from his prison in the cellar with a key that was left for her by her Aunt Marie. Aunt Marie left an apartment to Mina and her father. Mina's mother is never seen or mentioned in the series. Mina's style is punk alternative, and she is a fan of rock music and horror movies. She is usually completely oblivious to any supernatural happenings in the Orlock apartments despite saying that she would love to witness some supernatural activity herself. However, in the episode "Oh, Brother", Mina finally discovers Bunnicula is a vampire after seeing him flying with his chiropteran ears and sucking the juice out of a carrot with his fangs. But rather than being alarmed by this, she is amazed and immediately embraces him saying she'll always love him, no matter what. Mina's name is taken from the character, Mina Harker, of the original 1897 Dracula story. In the books Chester, Harold, Bunnicula, and Howie are owned by Robert, Ann, Pete, and Toby Monroe.

Others
 Arthur Monroe (voiced by Chris Kattan) - Mina's father who moves with his daughter to New Orleans from Middle America after inheriting an apartment from Aunt Marie. Everyone refers to him as "Mina's Dad", including himself on more than one occasion. This only adds to his already peculiar behaviour, as he has been seen in "My Imaginary Fiend" talking to thin air, and in "Family Portrait" he throws a princess-themed party for Mina for her 13th birthday. His wife isn't seen or mentioned in the series. His face is never on full view to the audience; usually it is blocked by a hat he is wearing or some other sort of obstacle. That is until the episode "Oh, Brother", when he looks up from a magazine he is reading and says hello to Bunnicula. His name is taken from Arthur Holmwood, who is one of the protagonists in the original 1897 Dracula story. In the books Arthur's name is Robert and he's married to Ann. They have two sons named Pete and Toby.
 Marsha (voiced by Monie Mon) - Mina's cautious and shy best friend, who serves as a foil to the outgoing Mina. Marsha is extremely unlucky and often the only human to notice supernatural activity.
 Becky (voiced by Kate Higgins) - Mina's other best friend. Becky is very monotone and sarcastic, acting like the stereotypical teenage girl.
 Scott Dingleman (voiced by Scott Menville) - Mina's love interest who shares many of her interests. Bunnicula, Chester, and Harold accidentally erased Scott's memories and tried to take advantage of him until they realized how much Mina missed Scott, and so restored his memory. For some reason, Scott can now understand them but chose to keep it a secret.
 Madame Polidori (voiced by Grey Griffin) - The owner of a shop containing many supernatural objects. Madame Polidori often has dangerous items on display, such as a harmonica that revives fish as zombies and the Haunted Portrait of Miserio. Though early episodes depict her as knowledgeable of the supernatural, she is later depicted as somewhat incompetent; several episodes have her sell these dangerous items and she mistakes Chester and numerous animals for magical creatures (though the end of the episode reveals that, with the exception of Chester and a mouse she captured, the animals actually were magical creatures). Madame Polidori doesn't like children or pets in her shop. She loves money. Her name is taken from the author John Polidori who is famous for having written the very first published vampire story, "The Vampyre" written in 1816. 
 Patches the Weredude (voiced by Eric Bauza) - A laidback, fun-loving weredude. Patches often forgets he is a weredude, and acts like a cat even in human form. Patches moved into the Orlock Apartments in "Revenge of the Return of the Curse of the Weredude".
 Lugosi (voiced by Richard Steven Horvitz) - A deformed and insane guinea pig obsessed with serving Bunnicula, but his way of doing so makes him an enemy. He is later adopted by Marsha, who he declares his new master. Lugosi is now an ally of Bunnicula, although still referring to him as his master, does what he can to protect him and offers help to him, Chester and Harold when they need advice. Lugosi's name is taken from the actor Bela Lugosi who is famous for portraying Dracula on-screen for the first time in 1931.
 Rusty Bones (voiced by Greg Eagles) - The ghost of a depressed blues singer who sang albums about his awful life. Rusty curses anyone who makes a mockery of his songs.
 Fluffy (voiced by Sumalee Montano) - A Doberman Pinscher who hunts vampires and originally was an enemy to Bunnicula. Later however, she became another close ally. Fluffy is a parody of Buffy the Vampire Slayer.
 Elvira - An imaginary cat.
 Veronica Rabbit (voiced by Abby Trott) - A rabbit.
 Baron Karloff (voiced by Donovan Patton) - A French Bulldog with his last name related to Boris Karloff, he once tried to summon a grave walker named Rip so that Fluffy can fight him and win because he is an obsess fan with Fluffy work and tried to get a vampire to bite him so he could be a vampire Fluffy can defeat for him. He speaks with an Eastern European accent.
 Hamburger Cheese (voiced by Scott Menville) - Mina's childhood imaginary friend.
 Mike Myers (voiced by Jeff Bergman) - An false animal protection officer and a one-time character who tried to lock up Marsha and Becky, because of a malicious trick played by Mina but got arrested by the Police afterwards. It is presumed he is in jail for a long time and exposed as a fraud. His name is a parody of Austin Powers star Mike Myers.
 Cassandra (voiced by Audrey Wasilewski) - A ghostly Southern alligator who is insecure. Cassandra is very emotional and gets upset when she loses her earrings or can't find her way home to the Bayou. Cassandra died prior to the series from unknown causes. Cassandra is able to shape shift, place a crying curse on people and animals, and travel through the sewer pipes. Her curse doesn't work on Bunnicula.
 Rafferty (voiced by Richard Steven Horvitz) - An albino squirrel.
 Count Cavanda (voiced by Scott Menville) - A vampire tick. Count Cavanda is a parody of Count Dracula.
 Dr. Pistachio (voiced by Eric Bauza) - A squirrel.
 Kenko (voiced by Patrick Warburton) - An evil wrath demon with a short bearded pale grey skin humanoid with blue hair. He has his hair in a ponytail. He wears a tarted shitagi, dark pants, cloth wrapped around both his arms and sandals.
 Chaos (voiced by Fred Tatasciore) - A cattle-headed demon. He once gathered the monster gangs of New Orleans to draw out Bunnicula by stealing his ears.
 West-End Lionesses - A gang of anthropomorphic lionesses that operate in West End, New Orleans.
 South Street Soul Stealers - A gang of spiritual skulls that operate on South Street.
 Spanish Moss Swamp Beasts - A gang of swamp monsters.
 Dumont Moth Men - A gang of small mothmen.
 Bay City Krakens - A gang of Krakens.
 Jefferson Parish Pixies (all voiced by Jasmine Kaur) - A pixie gang that operates in Jefferson Parish.
 Gentilly Rat Pack - A gang of anthropomorphic rats that operate in the sewers of Gentilly.
 Gentilly Rat Pack Leader (voiced by Robert Catrini impersonating Danny DeVito) - The unnamed leader of the Gentilly Rat Pack.
 Carmine - Member of the Gentilly Rat Pack.
 Danny - Member of the Gentilly Rat Pack.
 Enzo - Member of the Gentilly Rat Pack.
 Rocko - Member of the Gentilly Rat Pack.
 Big Tony - Member of the Gentilly Rat Pack.
 Futbol Furries - A gang of soccer-playing werewolves.
 Futbol Furries Leader (voiced by Rhasaan Orange) - The unnamed leader of the Futbol Furries.
 Skeleton Crew - A gang of skeletons that are vulnerable to Harold's love of bones.  
 Bunnicula's Brother (voiced by Chris Kattan) - Bunnicula's little brother that instead of sucking juice from vegetables, sucks the life force of supernatural creatures that also give him supernatural abilities.

Broadcast
In Canada, the series started airing on Teletoon on April 2, 2016. The series premiered on Boomerang on May 2 in the United Kingdom and Ireland. The series premiered on Boomerang on July 18 in Australia and New Zealand.

The series can also be streamed on Boomerang's SVOD subscription service, available on Android, iOS, desktop, Apple TV, Amazon Fire TV, Amazon Kindle Fire Tablet, Roku and Chromecast. As of 2021, YouTube (in the United States) offers season 1 episodes of Bunnicula on a pay-per-view basis by episode, and by the total season.

Home media
"Night of the Vegetable", a 2-disc DVD set featuring the first 20 episodes of season one, was released on June 27, 2017, by Warner Home Video. Originally, Warner Home Video was planning to release another 2-disc DVD set featuring the remaining 20 episodes of season one on February 13, 2018, but that release was cancelled for unknown reasons. Instead, Warner Home Video released "The Complete First Season", a 4-disc set containing all 40 episodes from season one, on May 8 the same year.

Reception
It has received positive reviews. Common Sense Media gave the series three stars out of five. Critic Emily Ashby states that the series is a fun pick for the whole family to enjoy with its silly antics and lighthearted paranormality.

References

External links
 Official website
 

2010s American animated television series
2010s American black comedy television series
2010s American supernatural television series
2016 American television series debuts
2018 American television series endings
American children's animated action television series
American children's animated adventure television series
American children's animated comedy television series
American children's animated fantasy television series
American children's animated horror television series
American children's animated supernatural television series
Extraterrestrial supervillains
American flash animated television series
American television shows based on children's books
English-language television shows
Boomerang (TV network) original programming
Cartoon Network original programming
Dark fantasy television series
Television series by Warner Bros. Animation
Animated television series about cats
Animated television series about dogs
Animated television series about rabbits and hares
Television shows set in New Orleans
Vampires in animated television